Manakau may mean:
 Manakau, a small town in the Horowhenua district of New Zealand
 Manakau (mountain), a peak in the Seaward Kaikoura Range, New Zealand

See also
 Manukau, a major suburb of Auckland, New Zealand